Sorkhabad (also Romanized as Sorkhābād; also known as Surkhābād) is a village in Sangestan Rural District, in the Central District of Hamadan County, Hamadan Province, Iran. At the 2006 census, its population was 1,414, in 350 families.

References 

Populated places in Hamadan County